Metzora may refer to:

 Metzora (parsha), the 28th weekly parshah or portion in the annual Jewish cycle of Torah reading
 A person affected by skin disease, or tzaraath